The auto24 Rally Estonia 2015 was the sixth running of the Rally Estonia and also the sixth round of the 2015 European Rally Championship season. The event was won by Alexey Lukyanuk & Alexey Arnautov who won 8 stages out of 16.

Classification

Event standings

Special stages

References

External links
 

2015 in Estonian sport
2015 European Rally Championship season
Rally Estonia